Omar Fayad Meneses (born 26 August 1962) is a Mexican politician from the state of Hidalgo who has served as a federal deputy and senator. He served as the Governor of Hidalgo from 2016 to 2022. He is a member of the Institutional Revolutionary Party.

Political career
Fayad was born on 26 August 1962 in Zempoala, Hidalgo to a Lebanese father and a Mexican mother. He obtained his law degree from the UNAM in 1985. After his graduation, he worked in Attorney General of Mexico's office for several years. In 1989, he moved to the National Institute of Penal Sciences (INACIPE) and later served at various education posts in the state of Hidalgo. He served as Hidalgo's secretary of public education and attorney general during 1996–98. He then served in several public safety and security capacities, including as a police commissioner or customs administrator. He also made regular appearances on radio programs as a political analyst.

In 2000, Fayad was elected to the LVIII Legislature as a federal deputy, serving as secretary of Special Commission on Public Safety and sitting on the Communications, Government and Public Safety Committees. He resigned in April 2003.

After his brief spell in Congress, Fayad returned to the Hidalgo state government, serving as Secretary of Agriculture (2003–05) and Secretary of Social Development (2005–06). In 2006, he ran for and won the municipal presidency of Pachuca. During his mayoral spell, he presided over Mexico's mayor association.

In 2009, Fayad returned to Congress, serving as parliamentary secretary of the Commission of Strengthening Federalism. Three years later, he ran and won a campaign for Senate, where he would serve in the LXII and LXIII Legislatures. He served on an array of commissions, including Public Safety, which he presided.

In 2010, Fayad was selected as the leader of the Institutional Revolutionary Party in Hidalgo. Fayad was strongly criticized in October 2015 when he attempted to introduce a new law against cybercrime that also criminalized the freedom of expression. One organization billed it "the worst Internet-related bill in history".

On 2 February 2016, Fayad left the Senate in order to seek the PRI nomination for Governor of Hidalgo. He won the gubernatorial election later that year and was sworn-in as governor on 5 September 2016.

Personal life
He married actress Victoria Ruffo in 2000. The couple has two children. During Fayad's term as municipal president of Pachuca, he designated Ruffo as the local director of the National System of Integrity and Familial Development.

In February 2016, Fayad was hospitalized after suffering an anaphylactic shock triggered by Rocephin.

In March 2020 he was confirmed to be infected with COVID-19.

See also
 List of presidents of Pachuca Municipality

References

Living people
1962 births
Governors of Hidalgo (state)
Members of the Senate of the Republic (Mexico)
Members of the Chamber of Deputies (Mexico)
Institutional Revolutionary Party politicians
Politicians from Pachuca, Hidalgo
21st-century Mexican politicians
Mexican people of Lebanese descent
National Autonomous University of Mexico alumni
Academic staff of the National Autonomous University of Mexico
Mexican prosecutors
Municipal presidents in Hidalgo (state)